Rancho Aguaje de la Centinela was a  Mexican land grant in present-day Los Angeles County, California given in 1837 to Ygnacio Machado. The name means "Sentinel of the Waters" in Spanish, and refers to the artesian water in the area exemplified by Centinela Springs. Rancho Aguaje de la Centinela included parts of present-day Westchester and Inglewood.

History
Rancho Ajuaje de la Centinela, was once part of the Rancho Sausal Redondo, and Ygnacio Machado had encroached on the land claimed by Antonio Avila, and was awarded provisional title to this land at the same time that Antonio Avila received his land grant for the balance of the Rancho Sausal Redondo in 1837. In 1845, Machado traded the rancho to Bruno Avila, brother of Antonio Avila, for a small tract in the Pueblo of Los Angeles.

With the cession of California to the United States following the Mexican–American War, the 1848 Treaty of Guadalupe Hidalgo provided that the land grants would be honored.  As required by the Land Act of 1851, a claim for Rancho Aguaje de la Centinela was filed with the Public Land Commission in 1852, and the grant was patented to Bruno Avila in 1872. 

Bruno Avila, unable to repay his debts, lost his property through foreclosure in 1857. Subsequent to this, the Rancho Ajuaje de la Centinela changed hands a number of times. Robert Burnett acquired the Rancho Ajuaje de la Centinela from Joseph Lancaster Brent in 1860. In 1868, Burnett added the Rancho Sausal Redondo, joining the two ranchos again. After Catherine's death in 1874, Daniel Freeman began the commercial development of the real estate. He became one of the directors of the Centinela Land Company, which started in 1874, with the purpose of developing commercially the Rancho Centinela. The venture failed, but Freeman was central in another undertaking, that of the Centinela-Inglewood Land Company in 1887 to develop what would be known as the town of Inglewood.

Marker and correction

The local chapter of the Native Daughters of the Golden West placed a marker mentioning Rancho Aguaje de la Centinela at the Theme Building of the Los Angeles International Airport in 1962.  

The following letter appeared in the Los Angeles Times on Sept. 14, 1963.

ERROR CITED IN AIRPORTS RANCHO MARKER

I’m surprised that a bronze marker at Los Angeles International Airport could show wrong information. The marker bears the words: “Original Mexican grant to Ignacio Machado in 1844 known as Rancho Aguaje de Centinela.”

No part of International Airport is within Rancho Centinela. All of the airport is within Rancho Sausal Redondo.

The nearest part of Rancho Centinela is 3700 ft from airport property.

I hope the wrong marker was changed. I like my history to be facts not fiction. 

David I. Worsfold, Palms

Related locations
Centinela Springs. Bubbling springs once flowed here.
Centinela Adobe is an adobe house constructed in 1834 by Ygnacio Machado.
 Centinela Creek, a tributary of Ballona Creek
 Centinela Park in Inglewood now Edward Vincent Jr. Park

References

External links
Library of Congress Online: Map of old Spanish and Mexican ranchos in Los Angeles County
 1875 Map of the Ranchos Centinela and Sausal Redondo

 

Aguaje de la Centinela
Aguaje de la Centinela
History of Los Angeles
Inglewood, California
Westchester, Los Angeles
Agua
19th century in Los Angeles